Robert Staddon may refer to:
 Robert Staddon (English sportsman) (born 1944), English cricketer and rugby union footballer
 Robert Staddon (swimmer) (born 1960), Australian Paralympic swimmer